Wonalancet may refer to:

 Wonalancet (sachem), a 17th-century Native American chief of the Penacook people
 Wonalancet, New Hampshire, an unincorporated community in the town of Tamworth in  Carroll County
 Wonalancet River, a short river in central New Hampshire and tributary of the Swift River
 Mount Wonalancet, elevation , in the Sandwich Range of the White Mountains, overlooking the Ferncroft neighborhood of Wonalancet

Alternative spellings
Wannalancit Mills, a textile-mill-turned-office-building which uses a variant spelling of Wonalancet, in Lowell, Massachusetts, which was an important fishing ground for the Pennacook
Wannalancit Street Historic District in Lowell
Wannalancit Lodge, Order of the Arrow lodge for the Greater Lowell Council of the Boy Scouts of America. Also the name of a former cabin located at Wah-tut-ca Scout Reservation of the Yankee Clipper Council, previously of the Greater Lowell Council.
 1867 Wannalancet Steam Fire Engine Company #1, Malden, Massachusetts
USS Wanaloset, also spelled USS Wanalosett, a United States Navy sloop-of-war of 1865 which was never completed, and which was intended to bear what probably is a variant spelling of Wonalancet
USS Wannalancet (YTB-385), later YTM-385, a United States Navy harbor tug in commission from 1944 to 1946 which used a variant spelling of Wonalancet